The 1973 Campeonato Nacional was Chilean first tier's 41st season. Unión Española was the tournament's champion.

Standings

Scores

Top goalscorers

References

External links
ANFP 

Primera División de Chile seasons
Prim
Chile